The 2011–12 season was Preston North End's 123rd year in The Football League and their first outside the second tier of English football in a decade, after they were relegated from the Championship the previous season.

Player info

League One data

League table

Results summary

Results

Preseason friendlies

League One

FA Cup

League Cup

JP Trophy

Managerial change

Season statistics

Starts and goals

|-
|colspan="14"|Players currently out on loan:

|-
|colspan="14"|Players featured for club who have left:

|}

Goalscorers record

Disciplinary record

End-of-season awards

Overall

Transfers

In

Notes1Although officially undisclosed, Preston North End Mad reported the fee to be around €100,000 (£84,000).

Loans in

Out

Loans out

Contracts

References

External links
 Official Site: 2010/2011 Fixtures & Results
 BBC Sport – Club Stats
 Soccerbase – Results | Squad Stats | Transfers

Preston North End
Preston North End F.C. seasons